The Battle of Basra was initiated by the Mahdi Army to capture the city of Basra in 2007. Following the reported major failure of the coalition forces, whose purpose was to stabilise Basra and prepare it for the turning over of security to Iraqi government forces, the city was overrun by insurgent forces from three different Iraqi factions including the Mahdi Army, and the British found themselves under major siege in their bases and capable of conducting only limited defence action in armoured convoys.

The bases
By this point in the war there were only four British bases left in Basra. One was on the outskirts of the city at the Basra Airport known as the Contingency Operating Base with a garrison of 5,000 personnel from all three Services, although mostly Army and RAF personnel. The second, was to the south east of the city at Basra Palace, a former palace of Saddam Hussein, with a garrison of 700 soldiers. The third was located to the north edge of the city on the river by Sinbad Island at the Shatt-Al-Arab Hotel, with a garrison of 600 soldiers. The fourth located in the city centre was at the Old State Building, garrisoned by a detached Company of British Soldiers, numbering around 80 soldiers, along with the nearby PJOC.

The siege

The first British soldier to die in the city, following Operation Sinbad, was Rifleman Daniel Lee Coffey, 2nd Battalion The Rifles, killed on 27 February while returning to the Shatt-Al-Arab Hotel.

The airport base was constantly hit, upwards of dozens of times a day, by mortar and rocket fire during the siege.  Despite the weight of fire, there was relatively little disruption to operations, as considerable effort had been put into Force Protection measures.  These included passive measures on the base, such as physical hardening of structures, and active measures, such as fighting patrols conducted by RAF Regiment squadrons in the Base's ground defense area, beyond the perimeter.

The Uti Triangle, a flat zone combining open wasteland, marsh and clustered buildings, was being used by the Mahdi Army (Jaysh al-Mahdi) to launch mortar and rocket attacks on both the airport and the palace.  Aggressive patrolling activity had denied the militias the opportunity to use the airport's ground defence area for launching anything other than a small number of rockets.  However, this may have had the effect of forcing the militias to use firing points that were further away, which meant that larger rockets, with correspondingly larger warheads were used.

More than 300 rockets hit the airport in the two months between June and August. Sniper attacks were also a deadly and common occurrence for British service personnel as well as IED attacks on patrols that were going out of the bases. The Old State Building was in a near constant siege, suffering in particular from sniper attacks from the overlooking buildings and RPG attacks from RPG alley in the Champagne glass area of the Al Tuwasia district. The IED attacks and organised ambushes also hit convoys from the airport that were transporting food, fuel, ammunition and other equipment for the bases in Basra. An example of this was on 4 April on a stretch of highway in the Hayaniyah district on the north-western outskirts of Basra, a Warrior Armoured Fighting Vehicle was hit by a massive bomb explosion which wrecked the vehicle and left a three-foot crater in the road, 4 British Soldiers and their interpreter were killed in the blast. Convoys were primarily used for this task because helicopters were at high risk from being shot down.

Retreat from Basra Palace
On 3 September under the cover of darkness and without any media attention, the British Army withdrew from Basra Palace to the airport, leaving their last foothold it had in the city. Basra was abandoned to the militias.

Aftermath
Following the withdrawal the UK was heavily criticized for pulling back from the city, mostly by the U.S. military, who themselves had failed elsewhere in Iraq. Formally, control of the city had been handed over to Iraqi security forces, but in effect the control of the city was in the hands of radical militias. They led a turf war in the coming months over control of the city and up to 100 people, mostly civilians, were being reported killed each month. A black market monopoly formed over the oil exports from the city.

At the end of March 2008, the situation in the city led to an Iraqi troop surge into the city and the 2008 Battle of Basra. This operation, 'Charge of the Knights', eventually led to an estimated 210 JAM killed, 600 wounded, and 155 captured.

British forces remained in control of Basra Airport until 2009 when it was handed over to Iraqi civilian control.  Number 7 RAF Force Protection Wing and No. 15 Squadron RAF Regiment were the last British forces to leave.  An interesting historical coincidence saw the same units being the last British forces to leave Camp Bastion, Helmand, Afghanistan, in November 2014.

See also

 Battle of Amarah
 Battle of Diwaniya
 Iraq War
 Iraqi insurgency
 List of United Kingdom Military installations used during Operation Telic

References

2007 in Iraq
Conflicts in 2007
Military operations of the Iraq War
Military operations of the Iraq War involving the United Kingdom
Iraqi insurgency (2003–2011)
History of Basra